John Patrick Sears (born February 19, 1996) is an American professional baseball pitcher for the Oakland Athletics of Major League Baseball (MLB). He made his MLB debut in 2022 with the New York Yankees.

Career

Seattle Mariners
Sears graduated from Wilson Hall, a private school in Sumter, South Carolina, and then attended The Citadel, where he played college baseball for The Citadel Bulldogs. He was selected by the Seattle Mariners in the 11th round of the 2017 Major League Baseball draft. He signed and spent his first professional season with the Everett AquaSox and the Clinton LumberKings, going 1–2 with a 0.65 ERA over  innings.

New York Yankees
On November 18, 2017, Sears along with Juan Then were traded to the New York Yankees for Nick Rumbelow. He spent the 2018 season with the Charleston RiverDogs, starting ten games and going 1–5 with a 2.67 ERA with 54 strikeouts over 54 innings. In 2019, he pitched for the Tampa Tarpons and went 4–4 with a 4.07 ERA over  innings. He did not play a minor league game in 2020 due to the cancellation of the season. He split the 2021 season between the Somerset Patriots and the Scranton/Wilkes-Barre RailRiders, going 10–2 with a 3.46 ERA over 25 games (18 starts), striking out 136 batters over 104 innings.

The Yankees added Sears to their 40-man roster after the 2021 season. He made the Yankees Opening Day roster in 2022 and made his major league debut on April 13. Sears earned his first major league win on April 16, but was optioned to Scranton/Wilkes-Barre after the game.

Oakland Athletics
The Yankees traded Sears, Luis Medina, Ken Waldichuk, and Cooper Bowman to the Oakland Athletics for Frankie Montas and Lou Trivino on August 1, 2022. The Athletics assigned Sears to the Las Vegas Aviators.

References

External links

Living people
1996 births
People from Sumter, South Carolina
Baseball players from South Carolina
Major League Baseball pitchers
New York Yankees players
Oakland Athletics players
The Citadel Bulldogs baseball players
Everett AquaSox players
Clinton LumberKings players
Charleston RiverDogs players
Tampa Tarpons players
Somerset Patriots players
Scranton/Wilkes-Barre RailRiders players
Las Vegas Aviators players